Antichloris scudderii is a moth of the family Erebidae. It was described by Arthur Gardiner Butler in 1876. It is found in the Amazon basin.

References

Moths described in 1876
Euchromiina
Moths of South America